7687 Matthias, provisional designation , is a stony Florian asteroid from the inner regions of the asteroid belt, approximately  in diameter. It was discovered on 24 September 1960, by Ingrid and Cornelis van Houten at Leiden, and Tom Gehrels at Palomar Observatory in California. The S-type asteroid was named for German amateur astronomer Matthias Busch.

Orbit and classification 

Matthias is a member of the Flora family, a giant asteroid family and the largest family of stony asteroids in the main-belt. It orbits the Sun in the inner asteroid belt at a distance of 2.0–2.5 AU once every 3 years and 5 months (1,249 days; semi-major axis of 2.27 AU). Its orbit has an eccentricity of 0.12 and an inclination of 6° with respect to the ecliptic. The body's observation arc begins with a precovery taken at Palomar in October 1953, or seven years prior to its official discovery observation.

Palomar–Leiden survey 

The survey designation "P-L" stands for "Palomar–Leiden", named after Palomar Observatory and Leiden Observatory, which collaborated on the fruitful Palomar–Leiden survey in the 1960s. Gehrels used Palomar's Samuel Oschin telescope (also known as the 48-inch Schmidt Telescope), and shipped the photographic plates to Ingrid and Cornelis van Houten at Leiden Observatory where astrometry was carried out. The trio are credited with the discovery of several thousand asteroid discoveries.

Physical characteristics 

In the SDSS-based taxonomy, Matthias is a common, stony S-type asteroid. It has an absolute magnitude of 14.2. As of 2018, no rotational lightcurve of Matthias has been obtained from photometric observations. The body's rotation period, pole and shape remain unknown.

Diameter and albedo 

According to the survey carried out by the NEOWISE mission of NASA's Wide-field Infrared Survey Explorer, Matthias measures 3.488 kilometers in diameter and its surface has an albedo of 0.333. Alternatively, the asteroid measures 3.9 kilometers, based on a generic magnitude-to-diameter conversion with an albedo of 0.24 – derived from 8 Flora, the parent body of the Flora family.

Naming 

This minor planet was named after German amateur astronomer Matthias Busch (born 1968), an observer and discoverer of minor planets at the Starkenburg Observatory in Heppenheim, Germany. The asteroid's name was proposed by Lutz Schmadel and its official citation was published by the Minor Planet Center on 8 December 1998.

References

External links 
 Dictionary of Minor Planet Names, Google books
 Discovery Circumstances: Numbered Minor Planets (5001)-(10000) – Minor Planet Center
 
 

007687
Discoveries by Cornelis Johannes van Houten
Discoveries by Ingrid van Houten-Groeneveld
Discoveries by Tom Gehrels
2099
Named minor planets
19600924